The Mazatzal Mountains (MAH-zaht-ZAL, locally Ma-tuh-ZEL) are a mountain range in south central Arizona, about 30–45 miles northeast of the Phoenix metropolitan area. The origin of the name remains obscure but one possibility is that it is from the Nahuatl language meaning "place of the deer". The crest of the Mazatzals forms the county line between Maricopa County and Gila County. SR 87, the Beeline Highway, traverses the Mazatzals on its way to Payson. They also include the Four Peaks, with elevation 7,659 ft, 2,334 m; a prominent mountain and landmark of the eastern Phoenix area.

The Mazatzal Wilderness Area protects  of the Tonto and Coconino National forests.

The eastern side of the wilderness consists of brush- or pine-covered mountains, sometimes broken by narrow, vertical-walled canyons. On its west side below the steep brush-covered foothills, the Verde River flows through the Sonoran Desert. The Verde was designated by the U.S. Congress as one of Arizona's two Wild and Scenic Rivers in 1984.

Great Unconformity, Mazatzal Wilderness region

At Pine, on Arizona State Route 87, at the northeast region of the Mazatzal Wilderness, north terminus of the Mazatzal Mountains, the route traverses the contact between two important geologic units. The horizontally laid Tapeats Sandstone, (common areal extent in Grand Canyon), was deposited on Precambrian granite, the Zoroaster Granite. The time between the erosion of the lower unit and deposition of the horizontal sandstone above, is about 1 billion years (1,000 million years), and is named the Great Unconformity. Besides its occurrence in the Grand Canyon, it is also found west, in the Las Vegas Valley, at Frenchman Mountain. The Zoroaster Granite and other granites, were intruded into the major unit of the Vishnu Schist, the basement paleo unit found in the Inner Gorge region of the Grand Canyon. The neighboring Sierra Ancha range has another occurrence of the Great Unconformity, with a sandstone unit that is an analogue of the Tapeats Sandstone.

The Arizona 87 highway section south of Pine is where the north Mazatzal Mountains merge into the western region of the Mogollon Rim, as the Rim continues northwest into the Oak Creek Canyon region.

References

Sources and external links 

 Mazatzal Wilderness Hikes at HikeArizona.COM
 Mazatzal Wilderness Area at USFS
 Mazatzal Wilderness Area at wilderness.net
 Geology of the Mazatzal Mountains, Central Arizona
 Mazatzal Mountains & Wilderness Area Hiking

Arizona transition zone mountain ranges
Mountain ranges of the Sonoran Desert
Mountain ranges of Maricopa County, Arizona
Mountain ranges of Yavapai County, Arizona
Mountain ranges of Gila County, Arizona
Mountain ranges of Arizona